Hanna Al-Sheikh Championship (also known as Hanna Al-Sheikh Cup)  was the first known football competition in Basra, held annually. Six clubs in Basra were involved in the tournament.

This tournament began in the 1945. The last season was in 1968 because the founder and sponsor of the competition migrated out of Iraq.

Participating Clubs 

Six clubs participated in the tournament: Al-Ittihad, Al-Ittihad Al-Malaki, Al-Jobayla, Al-Minaa, Sharikat Naft Al-Basra, and Thanawiyat Al-Basra.

See also 
 Iraq FA Cup
 Iraqi Premier League
 Iraq Football Association
 17 July Revolution

References

External links
 Iraqi Football Website

Football competitions in Iraq
Sport in Basra
Basra
1940s establishments in Iraq
1945 establishments in Iraq